Edgar Noah Free (20 June 1872 – 12 February 1938) was a dentist and a member of the Queensland Legislative Assembly.

Early life
Free was born in Ballarat, Victoria, to parents George William Free and his wife Amelia (née Turner). Receiving his schooling in Ballarat, he later attended Grey's Dental College in Melbourne before moving to Brisbane where he went on to practice in Queen Street for many years.

Political career
At the 1915 Queensland state election, Free, representing the Labor Party, won the seat of South Brisbane. He held the seat until 1920,  when he retired from parliament to live in Sydney, where his son was studying medicine at Sydney University.

Personal life
Free married Elizabeth N. Bulcock and together had one son and one daughter. He died in Brisbane in February 1938 and was buried at South Brisbane Cemetery.

References

Members of the Queensland Legislative Assembly
1872 births
1938 deaths
Burials in South Brisbane Cemetery
Australian Labor Party members of the Parliament of Queensland